Colin Emmanuel aka C-Swing is an English music producer, remixer and writer who works across most genres including Hip hop, R&B, Alternative and Soul genres.

He has produced, remixed or written for the likes of; The Beta Band, Jamelia, KRS-One, Beverley Knight, Braintax and Mary J. Blige among others.

Solo Releases

 D'illusions of Grandeur was released in January 2006.

References 

Hip hop record producers
Living people
Year of birth missing (living people)